André Jardin (1912–1996) was a French biographer and a historian, best known for his studies of Alexis de Tocqueville and the 18th century French history. His biography of 1984, Tocqueville, Alexis de Tocqueville: 1805–1858, translated into English as Tocqueville: A Biography in 1988 by Lydia Davis and Robert Hemenway—was acclaimed as the definitive account of the life and career of the author of Democracy in America.

Tocqueville scholarship

Jardin's decades-long work on the committee which collected and published Tocqueville's papers provided an excellent background for his biography of the famed political scientist and writer. While best known for his study of the nascent American republic, Tocqueville also had a long and varied career as a politician and writer on French political history. Jardin provides exhaustive detail on all aspects of Tocqueville's life, including his sometimes intense friendships and his marriage to a middle-class Englishwoman some years his senior.

Critics generally lauded the biography as the best study yet produced of Tocqueville's life and work. Historian Arthur Schlesinger, Jr. typically praised the book as "well-researched, informative and illuminating." Literary critic Max Lerner called it a "...definitive biography. André Jardin, currently general editor of the massive ongoing 30-volume collection of everything Tocqueville wrote, now presents the life with learning, authority, and precision."

In fact, a few critics felt that the biography was all too precise and detailed. In the Los Angeles Times Book Review, Annette Smith and David Smith demurred: "This long and scrupulous study of a man who was one of the most profound and prophetic thinkers of his time is, alas, scrupulous to the point of boredom...Although [the book] does justice to Tocqueville's ideas, it fails in rendering the passion and grace of his intellectual life and the social brilliance of the era."

Other works
Jardin also wrote, with Andre-Jean Tudesq, Restoration and Reaction, 1815–1848 (English translation of La France des Notables, 1973), a wide-ranging account of French life in Paris and the provinces during the turbulent era after Napoleon's downfall. Critics appreciated the breadth of the work, but some reviewers felt the book tried to be too comprehensive and thus could not adequately explore many facets of post-revolutionary French history.

In 1985 Jardin published Histoire du libéralisme politique: De la crise de l'absolutisme à la Constitution de 1875, a study of the political upheavals in France following the country's decisive defeat in the Franco-Prussian War of 1870–71.

References
 Tocqueville: A Biography by André Jardin, translated by Lydia Davis and Robert Hemenway, New York: Farrar Strous Giroux, 1988 
 Biography – Jardin, André (1912– ), article in Contemporary Authors (Biography) by the Gale Reference Team, Thomson Gale 2004

External links
 H-Net review of Tocqueville: A Biography
 New York Times review of Tocqueville: A Biography
 Policy review of Tocqueville: A Biography
 André Jardin at Catalogue en ligne Bibliothèque de l'Ecole supérieure des Beaux-Arts 

1912 births
1996 deaths
20th-century French historians
French male non-fiction writers
20th-century French male writers